John Smith  D.D. (baptised 14 October 1711 – 17 June 1795) was a British academic and astronomer.

His father was an attorney named Henry Smith and his mother was Elizabeth Johnson.  He was born in Coltishall, Norfolk and was educated at Norwich School and Eton.

He was admitted to Caius College, Cambridge University in 1732. He received a B.A. in 1735/6 and an M.A. in 1739.

He was successively dean (1744–1749), bursar (1750–1753), and president of the college (1754–1764).  He was Master of Caius from 1764 to 1795, and Lowndean Professor of Astronomy from 1771 to 1795.

He was ordained in 1739.  He installed a transit telescope above his college ante-chapel.

He did not seem to have left any scientific papers or given any lectures.

Offices Held

External links

References

1711 births
1795 deaths
People educated at Norwich School
Masters of Gonville and Caius College, Cambridge
Lowndean Professors of Astronomy and Geometry
British astronomers
People from Coltishall